The A97 is a major road in Aberdeenshire, Scotland. A very short section of the road is within Moray

Route 
It runs south from Banff on the north coast through Aberchirder, Huntly, Rhynie and Mossat before terminating at its junction with the A93 road at Dinnet.

References 

Roads in Scotland
Transport in Aberdeenshire
Transport in Moray